Jean-Marc Chouinard (born 6 November 1963) is a Canadian fencer. He competed in the individual and team épée events at four consecutive Olympic Games from 1984 to 1996.

References

External links
 

1963 births
Living people
Canadian male fencers
Olympic fencers of Canada
Fencers at the 1984 Summer Olympics
Fencers at the 1988 Summer Olympics
Fencers at the 1992 Summer Olympics
Fencers at the 1996 Summer Olympics
Fencers from Montreal
French Quebecers
Pan American Games medalists in fencing
Pan American Games silver medalists for Canada
Pan American Games bronze medalists for Canada
Fencers at the 1983 Pan American Games
Medalists at the 1983 Pan American Games
Pan American Games gold medalists for Canada
20th-century Canadian people
21st-century Canadian people